Apcera is an American cloud infrastructure company that provides a container management platform to deploy, orchestrate and govern containers and applications across on-premises and cloud-based infrastructure.

Company Overview 
Apcera was founded in 2012 in San Francisco by Derek Collison, previously a technology leader at Google, TIBCO and VMware (where he designed the first open Platform-as-a-Service (PaaS), Cloud Foundry).

Apcera’s primary offering, the Apcera Cloud Platform, provides IT governance and security through a policy driven model, allowing for the safe deployment and management of cloud-native applications, microservices, legacy applications, as well as IT resources, network and services access, and user permissions.

According to Forbes [Tech], the Apcera Cloud Platform enables clients "to manage the migration from legacy infrastructure to newer approaches and... allows them to achieve significantly faster time-to-market for … critical deployments, without sacrificing crucial security requirements”

In September 2014, Ericsson acquired a majority stake in Apcera for cloud policy compliance.

Software 
The Apcera Cloud Platform is available in two forms: a Community Edition and an Enterprise Edition. The Community Edition is free and can be used for deployment to a single infrastructure. The Enterprise Edition has the functionality to deploy workloads to multiple infrastructures. The Apcera Cloud Platform allows the user to create a set of rules to control available resources at a container level. In addition, it allows a user to connect to back-end services outside of the platform while maintaining governance. It allows users to build a workload once and then move it around in its container without re-writing the code — it only needs the connections made between containers.

Apcera also develops and provides support for several open source software projects, including NATS, a cloud-native enterprise messaging system, Kurma, a container runtime with extensibility and flexibility, and Libretto, a Golang virtual machine provisioning library for public and private clouds.

Major Clients 
Some of Apcera’s customers  include nextSource, Ericsson, Qualcomm, Cygate, Rodan Fields

Company Timeline

References 

Cloud computing providers